The Seventh Crystal is the twelfth novel in World of Adventure series by Gary Paulsen. It was published on July 1, 1996, by Random House.

Plot
The story is about Chris Masters who is having problems with bullies at his school, stealing his lunch money and threatening him. His next biggest problem is a video game called The Seventh Crystal which came in the mail with almost no instructions.

1996 American novels
Novels by Gary Paulsen
American young adult novels
Random House books